Roman Waschuk (also Roman Vashchuk, ; born 28 January 1962 in Toronto, Ontario) is a Canadian diplomat of Ukrainian ethnicity, Ambassador of Canada to Ukraine from 2014 to 2019.

Early life
Waschuk's parents immigrated to Canada from Western Ukraine after the Second World War. His father was born in present-day Ivano-Frankivsk Oblast, his mother born in Buchach. He studied history with focus on Central and Eastern Europe, also German and Russian, receiving 1985 a MA at University of Toronto. He worked for the Commission of Inquiry on War Criminals Juli 1985 – December 1986, Providing background information to investigators and counsel on WW2-era events in Central, Eastern and Southern Europe. He is fluent in English, French, German, Russian, Ukrainian, Polish and Serbian. He was member of the Ukrainian Scouting organization "Plast" in Canada.

Career
1987 he began his career in the diplomatic service of the Ministry of Foreign Affairs of Canada. First posted as second secretary for politics in the Canadian Embassy in Moscow, USSR. Then he subsequently served as political counsellor  in Kyiv and minister-counsellor for (politics and economy in Berlin.
1991-1994 he worked on East European affairs in the Department of Foreign Affairs, Trade and Development of Canada. From 1994 to 1998 he was Advisor at the Canadian Embassy in Kyiv.

In Ottawa Waschuk held the positions of a deputy director of the European Union Division, deputy director of the Policy Planning Division, director of the Global Partnership for Biological Non-Proliferation, Chemical Weapons Destruction and Redirection of Former Weapons Scientists Division, and director of the Stabilization and Reconstruction Programs Division.
 
Since 2011 Waschuk has served as ambassador to Serbia, with concurrent accreditation to the Republic of Macedonia and Montenegro. He served there until September 2014.

Since October 2014 he has been the Ambassador of Canada in Kyiv. He served there until October 2019.

He replaced Troy Lulashnyk, who was Ambassador to Ukraine from November 2011 to October 2014. Lulashnyk became Ambassador to the Arab Republic of Egypt.

He has published papers on Central European history, human security, and Canada-EU defence relations. About his time in Berlin he held a lecture at Munk School, University Toronto, titled "A Canadian in Berlin – Reflections On A Foreign Service Career And A Bilateral Relationship".

In an interview with The Canadian Press Washuk refused critics who complained that the Canadian embassy in Kyiv gave shelter to protesters during Ukraine uprising of February 2014, when his predecessor Lulashnyk was ambassador. He acknowledged the protesters were camped in the main lobby for at least a week. Waschuk also suggested no harm came of it. "From what I was told, it was several days and they left flowers on departure," he said. The opening of the doors was "a gesture designed to react and to reach out to the people suffering in the turmoil," Waschuk said.

See also
 Canada's Ambassadors in Kyiv
 Canada–Ukraine relations
 Euromaidan

References

External links 

 Roman Vashchuk, Canadian Embassy in Kyiv, Ambassador's Message 
 Department of Foreign Affairs, Trade and Development Canada, Diplomatic Appointments], Biography of Roman Vashchuk, September 19, 2014
 Biographical dates of Roman Waschuk
 Canada's Ambassadors since Ukraine's Independence
 Роман Ващук: «Канада сумела отстоять свое информационное пространство» (Interview with Roman Waschuk: Canada was able to maintain its information space), Forbes.net.ua, April 8, 2015.

1962 births
Living people
People from Toronto
Canadian people of Ukrainian descent
Ambassadors of Canada to Ukraine